The Immediate Geographic Region of Uberlândia is one of the 3 immediate geographic regions in the Intermediate Geographic Region of Uberlândia, one of the 70 immediate geographic regions in the Brazilian state of Minas Gerais and one of the 509 of Brazil, created by the National Institute of Geography and Statistics (IBGE) in 2017.

Municipalities 
It comprises 11 municipalities.

 Araguari    
 Araporã   
 Campina Verde   
 Canápolis    
 Cascalho Rico   
 Centralina   
 Indianópolis    
 Monte Alegre de Minas  
 Prata    
 Tupaciguara   
 Uberlândia

See also 

 List of Intermediate and Immediate Geographic Regions of Minas Gerais

References 

Geography of Minas Gerais